Selve Automobilwerke AG was a car maker located in Hameln (near Hannover, Germany).

After World War I, the Northern German Automobile Works, which made the Colibri car and the Sperber, was absorbed by the Selve firm, which was already producing Basse & Selve engines for the automotive industry. The first cars produced were the 24 horsepower 1.5 litre engine displacement and the 32 horsepower 2 litre model. The 40 hp 2090 cc model (which was later carried over to the 40 hp and 2352 cc) was also available in a  sport version. Six-cylinder models of 2850 cc in engine displacement were produced in 1925 and the Selecta 3075 cc engine produced in 1927 completed the product line.

Adolf Hitler was a fan of the automobile mark in the 1920s having a Green Selve 6/20 in which he was chauffeured around by his adjutant Julius Schaub.

These automobiles were produced until 1929, when car manufacturing was suspended due to the economic crisis of 1929.

References

Citations

Bibliography

Defunct motor vehicle manufacturers of Germany
Cars of Germany
Companies of Prussia